Raymond Moriyama  LL. D.  (born October 11, 1929) is a Canadian architect. 

In 1970, Moriyama co-founded a private practice in Toronto with Ted Teshima called Moriyama & Teshima Architects which is renowned for designing many major buildings across the world, including the Canadian War Museum and the Canadian Embassy in Tokyo. His focus is on humane architecture with the pursuit of true ideals, democracy, and unanimity of all people.

Early life and education
Born in Vancouver, British Columbia, Raymond Moriyama suffered burns as a four-year-old and was sometimes teased about his scars. During the eight months he spent bedridden after the accident, he saw an architect coming and going from a nearby construction site, "with a blueprint under his arm and a pipe in his mouth." Moriyama decided then and there that he would become an architect too.

Moriyama's father was an outspoken pacifist who was arrested and made a Prisoner of War for his activism. Moriyama was then twelve; his pregnant mother was left with him and his two sisters to run the family hardware store. Shortly after, he and his family were forced out of Vancouver and confined to an internment camp in the Slocan Valley of British Columbia during the Second World War. Japanese Canadians on the West Coast were classified as security threats, in a policy similar to that of the United States. He said these years were influential in his later career.

Moriyama has described his experiences in internment camps as miserable. During this time, his mother experienced a miscarriage, in which Moriyama then grieved the loss of a potential younger brother. He looked for a place for escape and solitude, and decided to build a treehouse outside of camp, as a lookout point. He made friends with Canadian farmers who supplied him with lumber and tools to build. He describes his experience of finding escape as such:"In despair, I decided to bathe in the Slocan River on the other side of a little mountain away from the camp. The water was glacial, but it was better than hot tears. To see who might be coming, I built an observation platform. Soon I found myself wanting to build my first architectural project, a tree house, without being found out by the RCMP. I used just an axe as a hammer, an old borrowed saw, six spikes, some nails, a rope, and mostly branches and scraps from the lumberyard. It was hard work building it by myself, and it was a lesson in economy of material and meansThat tree house, when finished, was beautiful. It was my university, my place of solace, a place to think and learn." After the war, his family reunited with his father and they resettled in Hamilton, Ontario, where he attended Westdale Secondary School and worked in a pottery factory. Ambidextrous, he was able to finish his piecework quickly, and his bosses allowed him to use his extra time to study for school.

During his years in University, he ran into his childhood friend Sachi from Vancouver. When they began to date, he knew immediately that she was the one he was going to marry. He told her this many times, but she just laughed. She never believed him. They married in 1954. Together, they had five children, including two sons who also become architects, Ajon and Jason Moriyama.  

Moriyama received a Bachelor of Architecture degree from the University of Toronto in 1954, and a Master of Architecture degree in civic and town planning from the School of Architecture at McGill University in 1957.

His sons, Ajon and Jason, became principals at Moriyama + Teshima Architects after Raymond Moriyama retired in 2003. In 2013, Ajon Moriyama founded Ajon Moriyama Architect, doing independent work in Toronto.

Career
Moriyama's first large project as an independent architect was the Ontario Science Centre in Toronto, built in 1964.

After years of working independently as an architect, Moriyama established his Toronto-based firm in 1958 and in 1970 was joined by Ted Teshima and is now Moriyama & Teshima Architects. Some of their notable early projects include the Scarborough Civic Centre from 1973, and the Metropolitan Toronto Reference Library from 1977. Both of these projects won Governor General's Medals. Moriyama has been heavily involved in bringing a Japanese cultural influence to Western society. He is a part of the Japanese Order of the Rising Sun, as well as the Order of Ontario. Many of Moriyama's architectural awards recognize his excellency in materiality, landscape, and urban design. Some of his core values as an architect involve the principles of designing for human scale and human functionality. Ted Teshima retired in 2006, and died in 2016. 

In 1985, Raymond Moriyama was made an Officer of the Order of Canada and promoted to Companion in 2008. He was also inducted into the Order of Ontario in 1992.

In 1997, he received the RAIC Gold Medal, Canadian Architecture's highest honour.

In 1999, he was the key architect for designing of the National Museum of Saudi Arabia in Riyadh.

From 2001 to 2007, he served as the Chancellor of Brock University in St Catharines, Ontario. He has designed several buildings at Brock University from the 1970s onwards.

In 2003, he was made a member of the Order of the Rising Sun, 4th class, a Japanese award given in recognition for his services to Japanese culture in Canada.

In 2007, he was honoured with a postage stamp by Canada Post featuring his design for the Ontario Science Centre.

In 2009, he was one of nine laureates to receive a Governor General's Award in Visual and Media Arts.

In 2010, he won the Sakura Award, for his impact and dedication in the promotion of Japanese culture worldwide.

In 2012, he received a Queen Elizabeth II Golden Jubilee Medal. He also created a $200,000 endowment with the Royal Architectural Institute of Canada called the Moriyama RAIC International Prize.

In June 2013, he received an honorary doctorate from the University of Calgary.

Moriyama retired in 2003.

Notable projects

Ontario Science Centre 

This was Moriyama's first large-scale project as an independent architect. It was built in 1969. Moriyama incorporated Confuciuan philosophies into his design, building on the ideas of tactile and experiential learning. The Science Centre functions as a place for visitors to experiment hands-on with installations.

The glass facade of the front entrance has a large, exposed steel cable structure. This gesture immediately involves visitors to experience the engineering and science behind architecture, an example of experiential learning in itself. The interior lends itself to flexibility, with large open spaces fit for various installations, exhibits, and large crowds.

Canadian embassy in Tokyo 
Moriyama designed this building during his time with Moriyama + Teshima. It was built in 1991. The prominent concept of this building is the "tree house", gaining inspiration from his childhood years spent in Japanese internment camps. He replicated the feeling of youthfulness and magic of the treehouse he first built while in camp. His intention was to enable a place of social connection and welcoming for all those visiting the Embassy.  The form resembles that of a temple. On the lower half, a large solid mass of concrete includes deep set windows, and above it, an asymmetrical glass peaked roof creates a light, sculptural contrast. Adjacent to the building is the Akasaka Imperial Grounds and the Takahashi Memorial Park. The building was limited in the shadows it was allowed to cast over the park, a restriction that led to its final shape.

Bata Shoe Museum 

Moriyama + Teshima designed the Bata Shoe Museum, built in 1995. It is recognizable by its angled trapezoidal limestone walls, and pyramid-like glazing on the front face. The interior reflects the angularity of the outside, with large open spaces for exhibitions with tilted walls. The interior is mostly wood, with "floating" display boxes with hidden supports, similar to the grand wooden staircase in the centre of the room.

This project won the City of Toronto Urban Design Award of Excellence in 1997.

Other projects

Toronto French School additions (2015)
Canadian War Museum (2005)
Science North, Sudbury, Ontario (1984)
National Museum of Saudi Arabia in Riyadh (1999)
Seneca College's Seneca@York campus Stephen E. Quinlan Building in Toronto (1999)
 John Labatt Visual Arts Centre, The University of Western Ontario, London, Ontario (1993)
Ottawa City Hall (1990)
North York Central Library (1987)
Museum London in London, Ontario (1980)
Peterborough Public Library, Peterborough, Ontario (1980)
Toronto Reference Library (1977)
Albert Campbell Collegiate Institute (1976)
Scarborough Civic Centre (1973)
L'Amoreaux Collegiate Institute (1971)
 Health Services Building, University of Waterloo (1968)
 Harvest Bible Chapel, Markham (1967)
Civic Garden Centre (now Toronto Botanical Garden), Toronto (1965)
 Gordie Howe International Bridge (under construction as of 2022)
 Burnhamthorpe Library and Burnhamthorphe Library Theatre (now Maja Prentice Theatre), Mississauga (1976)

Gallery

References

External links

 Moriyama & Teshima Architects
 Raymond Moriyama fonds
 Moriyama and Teshima Architects fonds, Archives of Ontario
 Architectural Dialogues... / Dialogues architecturaux... Moriyama & Teshima, 2010, Archives of Ontario YouTube channel

 
1929 births
Living people
Canadian architects
Modernist architects
Canadian university and college chancellors
Companions of the Order of Canada
Japanese-Canadian internees
McGill School of Architecture alumni
Members of the Order of Ontario
People from Vancouver
University of Toronto alumni
Governor General's Award in Visual and Media Arts winners
Recipients of the Order of the Rising Sun, 4th class